Ludovico Nucci was an Italian painter, active circa 1592 in Viterbo.

Biography
He is known for the ornamental elements of the frescoes in the ceiling of the Sala Regia of the Palazzo Communale of Viterbo. The figures were completed by Tarquinio Ligustri. The frescoes depict 33 castles and feuds under the governance of Viterbo.

References

1500s births
1600s deaths
People from Lazio
16th-century Italian painters
Italian male painters